Sergo Zakariadze (– 12 April 1971) was a Soviet and Georgian stage and film actor and pedagogue. People's Artist of the USSR (1958).

Zakariadze was born in Baku in 1909. He won several prizes, among them Best Actor honors at the 4th Moscow International Film Festival for his portrayal of an old peasant who joined the Red Army in order to find his son in the movie Father of a Soldier (Djariskatsis mama). His final role was in Bondarchuk's Waterloo as Prussian Marschall Gebhard Leberecht von Blücher, just a few months before his death. He died in Tbilisi.

Filmography

Awards 

 Medal "For Valiant Labour in the Great Patriotic War 1941–1945"
 Medal "For Labour Valour" (1941)
 Order of the Red Banner of Labour (1944)
 People's Artist of the Georgian SSR (1946)
 Stalin Prize, 1st class (1946)
 Order of the Badge of Honour (1950)
 Stalin Prize, 2nd class (1952)
 People's Artist of the USSR (1958)
 Lenin Komsomol Prize (1965)
 Lenin Prize (1966)
 Order of Lenin (1967)
 Shota Rustaveli Prize (1971, posthumous)

References

External links 
 
 Photograph from photo.ru
 

1909 births
1971 deaths
20th-century male actors from Georgia (country)
Actors from Baku
People from Baku Governorate
Seventh convocation members of the Supreme Soviet of the Soviet Union
Eighth convocation members of the Supreme Soviet of the Soviet Union
People's Artists of Georgia
People's Artists of the USSR
Stalin Prize winners
Lenin Prize winners
Recipients of the Lenin Komsomol Prize
Recipients of the Order of Lenin
Recipients of the Order of the Red Banner of Labour
Rustaveli Prize winners
Male film actors from Georgia (country)
Male stage actors from Georgia (country)
Soviet drama teachers
Soviet male film actors

Soviet male stage actors
Spoken word artists
Burials at Mtatsminda Pantheon